Bikhak-e Joruq (also Romanized as Bīkhak-e Jorūq; also known as Bīkhak) is a village in Famur Rural District, Jereh and Baladeh District, Kazerun County, Fars Province, Iran. At the 2006 census, its population was 689, in 143 families.

References 

Populated places in Kazerun County